Ammonium perrhenate (APR) is the ammonium salt of perrhenic acid, NH4ReO4. It is the most common form in which rhenium is traded. It is a white salt; soluble in ethanol and water, and mildly soluble in NH4Cl. It was first described soon after the discovery of rhenium.

Structure

The crystal structure of APR resembles that of scheelite, with atomic cation is replaced by ammonium. The pertechnetate (NH4TcO4), periodate (NH4IO4), tetrachlorothallate (NH4TlCl4), and tetrachloroindate (NH4InCl4) follow this motif. It undergoes a molecular orientational ordering transition on cooling without change of space group, but with a highly anisotropic change in the shape of the unit cell, resulting in the unusual property of having a positive temperature and pressure Re NQR coefficient. APR does not give hydrates.

Preparation
Ammonium perrhenate may be prepared from virtually all common sources of rhenium. The metal, oxides, and sulfides can be oxidized with nitric acid and the resulting solution treated with aqueous ammonia. Alternatively an aqueous solution of Re2O7 can be treated with ammonia followed by crystallisation.

Reactions
Ammonium perrhenate is weak oxidizer. It slowly reacts with hydrochloric acid:
NH4ReO4 + 6 HCl → NH4[ReCl4O] + Cl2 ↑ + 3H2O.
It is reduced to metallic Re upon heating under hydrogen:
2 NH4ReO4 + 7 H2 → 2 Re + 8 H2O + 2 NH3
Ammonium perrhenate decomposes to volatile Re2O7 starting at 250 °C. When heated in a sealed tube at 500 °C, It decomposes to rhenium dioxide:
2NH4ReO4 → 2ReO2 + N2 + 4 H2O
The ammonium ion can be displaced with some concentrated nitrates e.g. potassium nitrate,, silver nitrate, etc.:
NH4ReO4 + KNO3 → KReO4 ↓ + NH4NO3
It can be reduced to nonahydridorhenate with sodium in ethanol:
NH4ReO4 + 18Na + 13C2H5OH → Na2[ReH9] + 13NaC2H5O + 3NaOH + NH3•H2O.

References

 

Inorganic compounds
Perrhenates
Ammonium compounds